Weidemann is a German family name and may be deduced from the Middle High German terms for hunter or woad farmer.

The German word Weide also means willow, as well as pasture. The name could thus translate into willowman and hence suggests alternative meanings such as the occupational name for a basket maker or a person living near a willowtree. Since Weide (the tree) derives from Middle High German wîda, these meanings can not be assigned to the family name, whose origin dates back to mediaeval times. 

The family name Weidemann is first found in Westphalia, Germany, where the name Weidemann emerged in mediaeval times as one of the notable families of the region.

People with the surname
Christian Rudolph Wilhelm Wiedemann (1770–1840) - German entomologist.
Isabelle Weidemann (born 1995) - Canadian speed skater
Jakob Weidemann (1923–2001) - Norwegian painter.
Kurt Weidemann (1922–2011), German typographer, graphic designer, author, teacher.
Magnus Weidemann (1880–1967) - German evangelist, Photographer and Painter.
Volker Weidemann (1924-2012) - German astronomer.

See also
Weidemann GmbH, a manufacturer of agricultural equipment
Weideman
Weidmann
Weidenmann

References 

German-language surnames
Occupational surnames